Gula Mons is a volcano in western Eistla Regio on Venus; it is  high and located at approximately 22 degrees north latitude, 359 degrees east longitude.

Topographic features
Its main feature is a NE-SW-oriented rift-like fracture set connecting two summit calderas. There is also a structure which links the northern caldera and ridge system to Idem Kuva corona located NW of Gula Mons. Radially spreading lava flows which have digitate and broad sheet-like forms extend from the summit, including radar-dark flows which overlay several older lava deposits. Radial and circumferential fractures are present on the flanks.

References

Volcanoes of Venus